Fordham Road is a major thoroughfare in the Bronx, New York City, that runs west-east from the Harlem River to Bronx Park. Fordham Road houses the borough's largest and most diverse shopping district.  It geographically separates the North Bronx from the South Bronx.  

This street runs through the neighborhood of University Heights, divides Fordham from Fordham-Bedford and finally runs along the northern border of Belmont. It begins to the east as a continuation of Pelham Parkway and continues to the west over the University Heights Bridge into Manhattan, where it runs as West 207th Street. It is a two-way, four-lane road.  East of Webster Avenue Fordham Road runs concurrent with U.S. Route 1 from Webster Avenue to Boston Road. Fordham Road is divided into East Fordham Road and West Fordham Road by Jerome Avenue following after the Manhattan grid, with address numbers for both the East Fordham Road and West Fordham Road increasing away from Jerome Avenue. 

Fordham Road is under the management of the Fordham Road Business Improvement District, a non-profit organization under contract with the City of New York. The BID maintains, develops, and markets the merchants along Fordham Road and hosts many community events throughout the year.

Transportation
East of Webster Avenue and directly across from Fordham University, Fordham Plaza is a major hub for buses and a stop on the Metro-North Railroad's Harlem and New Haven lines. Metro North Railroad's Hudson Line stops at the University Heights station. Fordham Road is served by the New York City Subway at Jerome Avenue and Grand Concourse.

The Bx12 and Bx12 Select Bus Service are the primary routes running along the entire length of Fordham Road. Other bus routes in the area include the Bx9, Bx15, Bx17, Bx19, Bx22, Bx41 and Bx41 Select Bus Service, as well as Westchester County Bee-Line Bus routes 60, 61, and 62.

Points of interest
 Fordham Plaza is a major commercial and transportation hub.
 St. Nicholas of Tolentine's Church is located on West Fordham Road at University Avenue in University Heights.
 Rose Hill Campus of Fordham University is at 441 East Fordham Road.
 Theodore Roosevelt High School is on the other side of Fordham Road from Fordham University.
 The Bronx Zoo and New York Botanical Garden are at the eastern terminus of Fordham Road in Bronx Park.

Major intersections

References

External links
 Stores

Streets in the Bronx
U.S. Route 1